Anita Conti (née Caracotchian) (17 May 1899 – 25 December 1997) was a French explorer and photographer, and the first French female oceanographer.

Biography
Anita Caracotchian was born in Ermont in Seine-et-Oise to a wealthy Armenian family. She spent her childhood being educated at home by different tutors and travelling with her family, gradually developing a passion for books and the sea.

After moving to Paris, she concentrated on writing poems and the art of book binding. Her work got the attention of  celebrities and she won different awards and prizes for her creativity in London, Paris, New York and Brussels.

In 1927, she married a diplomat, Marcel Conti, and started traveling around the world, exploring the seas, documenting and reporting what she saw and experimented. Spending time on the fishing boats for days and even months on certain occasions gave her a deeper understanding of the problematic faced by the fishermen. In between the two world war, she developed the technique of fishing maps apart from the already used navigational charts. For two years, from one vessel to another, she observed the French fishermen along the coast and Saharan Africa discovering fish species unknown in France. She published many scientific reports on the negative effects of industrial fishing and the different problems related to fishing practices.

From 1943 and approximately for 10 years, she studied in the Mauritian islands, Senegal, Guinea and Ivory Coast, the nature of the seabed, different fish species and their nutritional values in regards of protein deficiency for the local populations. Gradually, she developed better preservation techniques, fishing methods and installed artificial dens for further studies. She  even founded an experimental fishery for sharks. She became more and more conscientious of the misuse of natural resources by the fishing industry and the major waste that could be prevented.

In 1971 she published L’Ocean, les bêtes et l’homme, to denounce the disaster that men create and its effects on the oceans. Through many conferences and forums and for the rest of her life, she advocated for the betterment of the marine world.

She died on 25 December 1997 in Douarnenez, Brittany.

On May 17, 2019, Google Doodle commemorated Anita Conti’s 120th birthday.

Works
 Géants des mers chaudes, Paris, 1957; éd. Payot & Rivages, 1997
 Racleurs d'océans, Paris, 1993; éd. Payot & Rivages, 1998
 [La] route est si longue avant la nuit, Fécamp, 1996
 L'Océan, les bêtes et l'homme ou l'ivresse du risque, éd. André Bonne, 1971
 Les Terre-neuvas, éd. du Chêne, Paris, 2004

References

Bibliography
 La dame de la mer - Anita Conti (1899-1997), photographe, éd. revue Noire en collaboration avec l'association "Cap sur Anita Conti", 1998
 Catherine Reverzy, Anita conti : 20 000 Lieues sur les mers, Odile Jacob, 2006

External links
 lycée Anita Conti de Bruz, Ille et Vilaine
 Armenian Women

1899 births
1997 deaths
People from Ermont
French people of Armenian descent
French explorers
French women photographers
French oceanographers
Ethnic Armenian photographers
20th-century French women